Joseph Pennacchio (born May 27, 1955) is an American Republican Party politician, who has served in the New Jersey Senate since January 8, 2008, where he represents the 26th Legislative District. Pennacchio has served in the Senate as the Deputy Republican Leader since 2022. He served in the General Assembly from 2001 to 2008.

Early life 
Pennacchio was born in Brooklyn, New York. He received a B.S. in 1976 from Brooklyn College in Biology and a D.D.S. degree in 1979 from the New York University College of Dentistry.

He served on the Morris County Board of Chosen Freeholders from 1998 to 2001 and is a former member of Governor DiFrancesco's New Jersey Economic Development Authority. He is the founder and a former member of the Montville Education Foundation, and a former member of the Montville Economic Development Council. He ousted incumbent freeholder, John M. Fox, in the 1998 Republican primary. He was succeeded by John Inglesino on the Board of Chosen Freeholders.

Pennacchio currently resides in Rockaway Township with his wife Diane.

New Jersey Assembly 
Pennacchio was elected to the New Jersey General Assembly in February 2001 by a special convention of district Republicans to fill the seat vacated by Carol Murphy, following her nomination by Acting Governor of New Jersey Donald DiFrancesco to the New Jersey Board of Public Utilities.

New Jersey Senate 
Pennacchio ran for state Senate in 2007 upon the retirement of Robert J. Martin. He has since served as Assistant Minority Leader from 2014 to 2017 when he was chosen as Minority Whip. During the 2019 budget fight, Democrats contradicted Governor Phil Murphy and passed a budget without the millionaires' tax. Pennacchio, alongside six other Republicans, voted for the budget.

Committees 
Committee assignments for the current session are:
Economic Growth
Legislative Oversight

District 26 
Each of the 40 districts in the New Jersey Legislature has one representative in the New Jersey Senate and two members in the New Jersey General Assembly. The representatives from the 26th District for the 2022—23 Legislative Session are:*Senator Joseph Pennacchio (R)
Assemblyman Christian Barranco (R)
Assemblyman Jay Webber (R)

United States House campaign 
In 1994, Pennacchio challenged Congressman Dean Gallo in the Republican primary. He lost the primary.

United States Senate campaign 
On January 17, 2008, Pennacchio launched his campaign for the 2008 United States Senate race. On June 3, 2008 he was defeated in the Republican primary by former Congressman Dick Zimmer.

Controversies 
In 1991, Pennacchio sent a 94-page white paper called the "Nationalist Agenda" to then-New Jersey General Assembly minority leader Chuck Haytaian. The manifesto, among other things, called for a new "Nationalist Party;" Balanced Budget Amendment; Line-item Veto Amendment; Term Length/Limit Amendment (six-year terms for presidents, senators, and congressmen and twelve-year term limits for each office); Anti-Racism Amendment; Amend the 2nd Amendment to allow for regulation and banning of certain guns and ammunition; Death Penalty Amendment (make murder a federal crime and ensure that the death penalty is allowed); Equal Rights Amendment (albeit slightly amended); Flag-Burning Amendment; abolition of the Electoral College; establishment of regional presidential primaries; Establishment of a federal "Department of Science";  national lottery (funded by voluntary $52-per-year contributions on tax returns; only those participating would be eligible to win), school vouchers; reforms to Social Security, Medicare, Medicaid, and Welfare Reform; letting the homeless stay in military bases; and mandatory military service for non-violent criminals. This has been referred to by his primary opponent as a "fascist manifesto". Sabrin called for him to drop out of the Senate race and resign from the State Senate. Pennacchio refused to drop out, and said that these were ideas he came up with before he ran for office, and that he had "evolved" beyond many of them. Pennacchio described these attacks as "anti-Italian". Despite these attacks, he bested Sabrin by a wide margin.

Involvement in Trump campaign 
On October 16, 2019, the Donald Trump 2020 presidential campaign announced that Pennacchio and State Senator Mike Testa would be honorary state chairs of Trump's Victory Team.

Electoral history

New Jersey Senate

New Jersey Assembly

References

External links
Senator Joseph Pennacchio's official site
Senator Pennacchio's legislative webpage, New Jersey Legislature
New Jersey Legislature financial disclosure forms
2011 2010 2009 2008 2007 2006 2005 2004
Joseph 'Joe' Pennacchio, Project Vote Smart
Joseph Pennacchio's Nationalist Agenda: “A blueprint for the 21st century” (PDF)
Official US Senate Campaign Website - www.JerseyJoe08.com

1955 births
Living people
American people of Italian descent
Brooklyn College alumni
County commissioners in New Jersey
Republican Party New Jersey state senators
Republican Party members of the New Jersey General Assembly
New York University College of Dentistry alumni
People from Montville, New Jersey
People from Rockaway Township, New Jersey
Politicians from Morris County, New Jersey
21st-century American politicians